Baltra is a Chilean surname.

People with the name
 Alberto Baltra (1912–1981), Chilean politician and economist
 Mireya Baltra (born 1932), Chilean sociologist, journalist, and politician
 Ruth Baltra Moreno (1938–2014), Chilean actress, dramatist, teacher, and theater director

See also
 Baltra Island, Galápagos Islands, Ecuador

References

Spanish-language surnames